Avittonia is a monotypic moth genus of the family Noctuidae. Its only species, Avittonia albidentata, is known from Singapore. Both the genus and the species were first described by George Hampson in 1926.

References

Catocalinae
Monotypic moth genera